Roberto Patino is an American screenwriter and television writer, known for writing the film Cut Bank, starring Liam Hemsworth, John Malkovich and Billy Bob Thornton. He created and served as showrunner of the HBO Max miniseries DMZ, was a writer and executive producer on the HBO series Westworld, and has written on the NBC series Prime Suspect and the FX series Sons of Anarchy.

He graduated from Harvard University in 2006.
In September 2018, he signed an overall deal with Warner Bros. Television. In November 2021, he moved his overall deal to Netflix.

References

External links

American male screenwriters
American television writers
American male television writers
Harvard University alumni
Living people
Showrunners
Place of birth missing (living people)
Year of birth missing (living people)